Charles P. Noell (1812–1887) San Diego Democratic politician.

Charles P. Noell was born in Bedford County, Virginia February 20, 1812. He came to California in November 1848 and was a San Francisco merchant, but lost all in a fire in 1850.  He moved to San Diego in 1850 and built a store, the first wooden building in the city.

Noell served as one of the city's first council man in 1850. While councilman he tried to prevent looting of the city treasury, with limited success.  The city went bankrupt and control went to the State of California. He was appointed President for the San Diego city Board of Trustees (informally called "Mayor") during 1852, after the elected city government was abolished during bankruptcy. Noell served in the California State Assembly in 1854.

Noell never married and died December 30, 1887. His tombstone reads:
An Honest Man is the Noblest Work of God

See also
 Biography in William E. Smythe's History of San Diego (1907), part 2 chapter 12.

Politicians from San Diego
1812 births
1887 deaths